Rajdevi Temple (Nepali language:राजदेवी मन्दिर) is a famous Hindu temple in Central Nepal. The primary deity is Rajdevi. It is situated in the Rajdevi Municipality, Gaur, Rautahat. This Temple is a main attraction for Rautahat and Indian Pilgrims. People are likely to come here in Bada Dashain.

References 

Hindu temples in Madhesh Province
Buildings and structures in Rautahat District